Isaac Siegel (April 12, 1880 – June 29, 1947) was a United States Representative from New York.

Biography
He was born in New York City and attended the public schools. Siegel graduated from New York University School of Law in 1901 and was admitted to the bar on May 26, 1902. He commenced practice in New York City thereafter and was appointed special deputy attorney general for the prosecution of election frauds in 1909 and 1910. Siegel was elected as a Republican to the Sixty-fourth and to the three succeeding United States Congresses (March 4, 1915 – March 3, 1923).

He was chairman of the Committee on the Census (Sixty-sixth and Sixty-seventh Congresses). He was not a candidate for renomination in 1922. During the First World War, he was a member of the overseas commission which visited France and Italy during July and August 1918. He was also delegate to the Republican National Conventions in 1916, 1920, 1924, and 1936.

On September 14, 1940, Siegel was appointed to the bench and served as justice of the domestic relations court of New York City until his death. He died in an accidental fall from a window in his New York City apartment.  He is interred at Union Field Cemetery in Ridgewood, NY.

See also 
List of Jewish members of the United States Congress

References

External links
  Retrieved on 2013-08-28
 Retrieved on 2013-08-28
Isaac Siegel at Political Graveyard Retrieved on 2013-08-28
Guide to the Isaac Siegel Papers at the American Jewish Historical Society, New York City

1880 births
1947 deaths
New York University School of Law alumni
Jewish members of the United States House of Representatives
Politicians from New York City
Accidental deaths from falls
Accidental deaths in New York (state)
Republican Party members of the United States House of Representatives from New York (state)
Burials at Salem Fields Cemetery
20th-century American politicians